Jay Bryant Haviser, Jr. (born November 21, 1955, Bartow, Florida) is an American-born archaeologist and anthropologist who has conducted archaeological fieldwork in St. Martin and Curacao. Haviser received a BA and a MS from Florida State University, US, and received a Ph.D. in 1987 from the  Royal University of Leiden, T for a  dissertation= "Amerindian Cultural Geography on Curaçao". His findings are published internationally and form the basis of our knowledge about the prehistory of these islands. Haviser is  director of the St. Maarten Archaeological Center (SIMARC), and formerly was  a researcher at Leiden University, the Netherlands and has formerly served as vice president of the International Association of Caribbean Archaeology. He lives in St. Martin.

Works

African Sites: Archaeology in the Caribbean
African Sites: Archaeology in the Caribbean is a book by Jay Haviser, first published in 1999 by Markus Weiner Publishers.

The book's publisher states that "This book examines archaeological research about African peoples who were brought to the Caribbean, as well as their descendants in the twentieth century. These contributions cover a wide geographic sample of regions and range from Caribbean studies to individual investigations on 12 different islands of the English, Dutch, Spanish, and French territories."

The book has been reviewed by publications including The Hispanic American Historical Review, International Journal of African Historical Studies, and North American Archaeologist.

African Re-Genesis: Confronting Social Issues in the Diaspora
African Re-Genesis: Confronting Social Issues in the Diaspora is a book by Jay Haviser and Kevin C. MacDonald, first published in 2008 by Routledge.

The book has been reviewed by publications including Azania: Archaeological Research in Africa and African Diaspora Archaeology Newsletter.

The World Archaeological Congress stated that African Re-Genesis "is the first book to emphasise the relevancy of current research to contemporary issues in diaspora communities. The contributions to this book demonstrate how the spirit of Africa has survived and re-emerged through contacts with new environments and cultures."

References

1955 births
Living people
American archaeologists
American expatriates in the Netherlands
Florida State University alumni
Leiden University alumni
People from Bartow, Florida